Whitaker (also Whittaker) is a surname of English and Scottish origin, meaning the white acre, also spelled "Whittaker" and "Whitacre." Notable people with the surname include:

People with the name
 The Whitaker iron family - a family important in the iron and steel industry in 19th and 20th century America
 A. J. Whitaker (Ayana Jean Whitaker; born 1992), American volleyball player
 Alexander Whitaker (1585–1616), American religious leader
 Amoret Whitaker, forensic entomologist
 Anthony Whitaker (1944–2014), New Zealand herpetologist 
 Ayton Whitaker (1916–1999), British producer and director of radio, film and television
 Arthur Luther Whitaker (1921–2007), American minister, professor, psychologist, and sociologist
 Benjamin Whitaker (disambiguation)
 Berry Whitaker (1890–1984), American football college coach
 Billy Whitaker (1923–1995), English football defender
 Brandon Whitaker (born 1985), Canadian football running back 
 Brian Whitaker, British journalist
 Candi Whitaker (born 1980), American college basketball coach
 Carl Whitaker (1912–1985), American therapist
 Carol Whitaker (born 1982), Canadian curler
 Charles Whitaker (c. 1642 – 1715), English politician
 Chico Whitaker (born 1931), Brazilian social-justice advocate 
 Chris Whitaker (born 1974), Australian rugby union player
 Colin Whitaker (1932–2015), English football left winger
 Corinne Whitaker (born 1934), American digital artist
 Cuthbert Whitaker (1873–1950), editor of Whitaker's Almanack
 Danny Whitaker (born 1980), English footballer
 Danta Whitaker (born 1964), American football tight end
 David Whitaker (disambiguation), several people
 Denis Whitaker (1915–2001), Canadian general
 Denzel Whitaker (born 1990), American actor
 Deonce Whitaker (born 1978), Canadian football running back
 Duane Whitaker (born 1959), American actor
 Ed Whitaker (1938–2014), American stock car team owner
 Edward Whitaker (1660–1735), Royal Navy officer
 Edward W. Whitaker (1841–1922), Union Army officer during the American Civil War, Medal of Honor recipient
 Ellen Whitaker (born 1986), English show jumping rider
 Elizabeth Raffald (née Whitaker; 1733–1781), English businesswoman, author of The Experienced English Housekeeper cookery book 
 Elsie Whitaker Martinez (1890–1984), daughter of Herman Whitaker
 Eric Whitaker (disambiguation)
 Evelyn Whitaker (1844–1929), children's writer
 Ewen Whitaker (1922–2016), British-American astronomer
 Forest Whitaker (born 1961), American actor
 Francis Whitaker (1906–1999), American blacksmith
 Franklin Whitaker (died 1891), American politician
 Frederic Whitaker (1891–1980), American watercolorist
 Frederick Whitaker (disambiguation)
 George Whitaker (disambiguation), several people
 Harold Whitaker (1920–2013), British animator
 Henry Whitaker (c. 1549 – 1589), English politician, Member of Parliament for Westbury (1586–1588)
 Henry Whitaker (c. 1622 – 1695), English lawyer and politician, Member of Parliament for Shaftesbury (1659, 1661–1679)
 Herman Whitaker  (1867–1919), American writer
 Hugh Whitaker (born 1961), British rock drummer
 Jack Whitaker (1924–2019), American sportscaster
 James Whitaker (disambiguation)
 Janet Whitaker, Baroness Whitaker (born 1936), British Labour politician
 Jared Whitaker (1818–1884), mayor of Atlanta, Georgia
 Jason Whitaker (born 1977), American football player
 Jeremiah Whitaker (1599–1654), English Puritan clergyman, member of the Westminster Assembly
 Jim Whitaker (Norris J. Whitaker; born 1950), American politician, Mayor of Fairbanks North Star Borough, Alaska (2003–2009)
 Joel Whitaker (1877–1947), physician and college football player and coach
 John Whitaker (disambiguation), several people
 Joseph Whitaker (disambiguation), several people
 Kati Whitaker, British radio and TV journalist
 Kevin Whitaker (born 1957), American diplomat
 Lance Whitaker (born 1971), heavyweight boxer
 Laurence Whitaker (c. 1578 – 1654), English politician
 Lawrence Whitaker (game designer), American role-playing game designer
 Lang Whitaker, American sportswriter
 Larry Whitaker, American animation director
 Lily C. Whitaker (1850–1932), American educator, writer; daughter of Mary Scrimzeour Whitaker
 Lou Whitaker (born 1957), American baseball player
 Lucian "Skippy" Whitaker (born 1930), American basketball player
 Lyman Whitaker, American sculptor 
 Mabel Whitaker (1884–1976), New Zealand teacher and local historian
 Maria do Céu Whitaker Poças, Céu, Brazilian singer
 Marjorie Whitaker (better known as Malachi Whitaker; 1895–1976)
 Mark Whitaker (disambiguation), several people
 Martin Whitaker, British businessman
 Martin D. Whitaker (1902–1960), American physicist
 Matthew Whitaker (disambiguation)
 Matthew Whitaker, acting U.S. Attorney General (born 1969)
 Matthew Whitaker (pianist) (born 2001), American jazz pianist
 Matthew C. Whitaker, American historian
 Mary Scrimzeour Whitaker (1820–1906), American author; mother of Lily C. Whitaker
 Meade Whitaker (1919–2005), United States Tax Court judge
 Michael Whitaker (born 1960), British equestrian rider,
 Mike Whitaker (swimmer) (born 1951), Canadian Olympic swimmer
 Milton C. Whitaker (1870–1963), American chemist
 Neil Whitaker (1931–2008), Australian rules footballer 
 Nelson E. Whitaker (1839–1909), President of the West Virginia Senate 1897–1899
 Nick Whitaker (born 1988), American actor
 Norman T. Whitaker (1890–1975), International Master of chess
 O'Kelley Whitaker (1926–2015), bishop of the Episcopal Diocese of Central New York (1983–1992)
 Ozi William Whitaker (1830–1911), bishop of the Episcopal Church
 Pat Whitaker (1865–1902), Major League Baseball pitcher
 Paul Whitaker (born 1973), English and New Zealand cricketer
 Pernell Whitaker (1964–2019), American boxer
 Peter Whitaker, English actor
 Phil Whitaker (born 1966), British novelist and physician
 Ray Whitaker, Australian rules footballer 
 Richard Whitaker (born 1947), Australian meteorologist
 Richard Whitaker (architect), American Third Bay Tradition architect
 Robert Whitaker (disambiguation), several people
 Rod Whitaker (disambiguation)
 Rogers E. M. Whitaker (1900–1981), editor of The New Yorker magazine
 Romulus Whitaker (born 1943), herpetologist
 Ronyell Whitaker (born 1979), American professional football player
 Rosa Whitaker, American entrepreneur
 Ross T. Whitaker, American engineer
 Ruth Whitaker (1936–2014), American politician
 Samuel Estill Whitaker (1886–1967), Tennessee attorney, mayor of Riverview, Tennessee, and judge of the United States Court of Claims
 Sheila Whitaker (1936–2013), English film programmer and writer
 Slim Whitaker (Charles Orbie Whitaker; 1893–1960), American film actor
 Steve Whitaker (baseball) (born 1943), American baseball player
 Steve Whitaker (1955–2008), British artist 
 T. K. Whitaker (1916–2017), Irish economist
 Thomas Bartlett Whitaker (born 1979), American convicted criminal
 Thomas Dunham Whitaker (1759–1821), English clergyman and topographer
 Thomas W. Whitaker (1904–1993), American botanist and horticulturist
 Timothy W. Whitaker (born 1948), Bishop of the United Methodist Church
 Todd Whitaker, American educator, writer, and motivational speaker
 Uncas A. Whitaker (1900–1975), prominent mechanical engineer, electrical engineer, lawyer, entrepreneur, and philanthropist
 Walter C. Whitaker (1823–1887), Union general during the American Civil War
 Wetzel Whitaker (also known as Judge Whitaker; 1908–1985), American Mormon filmmaker
 William Whitaker (disambiguation) (several people)

Fictional characters
 Brad Whitaker, fictional character from the James Bond film The Living Daylights
 Faye Whitaker, fictional character from the webcomic Questionable Content
 John Avery Whitaker, character from the Adventures in Odyssey radio drama

English-language surnames